Lindi Nature Reserve is a nature reserve situated in south-western Estonia, in Pärnu County.

Lindi Nature Reserve was established in 1958, and the protection of the site was expanded in 1999. The nature reserve is centred on Lindi bog, and consists mostly of herb-rich, wooded areas. It is an important habitat for many species, notably large birds of prey like the lesser spotted eagle and the white-tailed eagle.

References

Nature reserves in Estonia
Audru Parish
Tõstamaa Parish
Forests of Estonia
Wetlands of Estonia
Geography of Pärnu County
Landforms of Pärnu County